The 1911 Auburn Tigers football team represented Alabama Polytechnic Institute (now known Auburn University) as a member of the Southern Intercollegiate Athletic Association (SIAA) during the 1911 college football season. The team was led by head coach Mike Donahue, in his seventh year, and played their home games at both Drake Field in Auburn and Rickwood Field in Birmingham, Alabama. They finished the season with a record of four wins, two losses, and one tie (4–2–1 overall, 4–0–1 in the SIAA).

Schedule

References

Auburn
Auburn Tigers football seasons
Auburn Tigers football